J. Barbour & Sons Ltd is a British luxury and lifestyle brand founded by John Barbour in 1894 that designs, manufactures and markets waxed cotton outerwear, ready-to-wear, footwear and accessories under the Barbour and Barbour International brands.  Founded in South Shields, England, as an importer of oil cloth, J. Barbour and Sons Ltd became known for its waxed cotton jackets, a common element of British country clothing; some refer to any waxed cotton jacket, regardless of brand, as a "Barbour jacket". J. Barbour and Sons Ltd holds royal warrants for the supply of ‘waterproof and protective clothing’ from the Duke of Edinburgh (1974), Queen Elizabeth II (1982) and King Charles III (1987).

History 
John Barbour, a native of Galloway, Scotland, founded J. Barbour and Sons Ltd in South Shields, England, in 1894 as an importer of oil-cloth. John's grandson Duncan, a keen motorcyclist, would also take the company in that direction during his tenure as Barbour became the originator of waxed cotton motorcycling suits and jackets.

The headquarters for J. Barbour and Sons Ltd at the time of its foundation was located at 5 Market Place, South Shields and the company remains in South Shields today having occupied its current site since the 1980s.

Since July 2016, Scottish actor Sam Heughan is Barbour's First Global Brand Ambassador.

Products

In addition to its waxed and quilted jackets, J. Barbour & Sons Ltd is famous for sweaters, moleskin clothing, corduroy clothing, and tattersall shirts. Barbour entered the "waterproof-breathable" market with its own type of waterproof liners, Cordura external fabric, and polar fleece sweaters. Some Barbour products contain outdoor-orientated features such as snug-fitting collars, "storm cuffs", waterproof pockets with drainage holes, and wide "game" pockets. In recent years, the company modernized its collections to appeal to a younger clientele while maintaining credibility with the traditional countryside customer. Many of the more fashionable ranges are influenced by the "Barbour International" motorcycling ranges. Taking inspiration from the company's 1936 waxed cotton motorcycling suit and the 1951 "Original Green" motorcycling jacket, modern collections are fashionable interpretations of the companies heritage in bikes. While the traditional waxed cotton jackets are still manufactured in Simonside, South Shields, some of the other products are manufactured outside the United Kingdom.

Despite traditional connotations with rural life, Barbour jackets saw increased popularity as an urban fashion item in the 2010s decade. In 2010s Barbour collaborated with several urban fashion brands including Wood Wood, Ally Capellino and White Mountaineering.

Services

Wear-and-tear on Barbour garments can be addressed by Barbour's repair service, which patches and reinforces jackets. J. Barbour and Sons Ltd repairs and rewaxes over 25,000 jackets annually at the Simonside, South Shields and other facilities.

Aside from offering merchandise within Barbour retail stores, Barbour wholesales all of its collections to many upscale shops worldwide.

In popular culture 
Barbour's waxed jackets and coats have appeared in 2012's Skyfall, in which James Bond, played by Daniel Craig wears a modified Barbour jacket. Barbour has a long-standing line of clothing inspired by actor and avid motorcycle racer Steve McQueen, who exclusively wore Barbour during races.

References

External links

British brands
British Royal Warrant holders
Clothing brands of the United Kingdom
Clothing companies established in 1894
Luxury brands
Outdoor clothing brands
1894 establishments in England